James William Foster (died November 17, 1932) was an American politician from Maryland. He served as a member of the Maryland House of Delegates, representing Harford County from 1900 to 1901.

Early life
James William Foster was born in Havre de Grace, Maryland.

Career
Foster worked as the manager of John H. DuBois lumber business.

Foster was a Democrat. He served as a member of the Maryland House of Delegates, representing Harford County from 1900 to 1901. Foster withdrew his nomination for re-election in August 1901.

Foster was a member of the building committee for the Methodist Episcopal Church of Havre de Grace completed in 1902.

Personal life
Foster was a member of the Methodist Episcopal Church.

Foster died on November 17, 1932, at the age of 90, in Havre de Grace. He was interred at Angel Hill Cemetery.

References

Year of birth uncertain
1840s births
1932 births
People from Havre de Grace, Maryland
Democratic Party members of the Maryland House of Delegates
Members of the Methodist Episcopal Church